Kani Kabud may refer to:
 Kani Kabud, Gilan-e Gharb, Kermanshah Province
 Kani Kabud, Kermanshah
 Kani Kabud, Divandarreh, Kurdistan Province
 Kani Kabud-e Maran, Divandarreh County, Kurdistan Province